Thomas Miller (born 13 February 1963) is a German former professional footballer who played as a defender.

Miller made 82 appearances for TSV 1860 Munich in the Bundesliga during his playing career.

References

External links 
 

1963 births
Living people
German footballers
Association football defenders
Bundesliga players
2. Bundesliga players
SpVgg Unterhaching players
FC Augsburg players
TSV 1860 Munich players